"Sunroof" is a song by American singer Nicky Youre and Los Angeles-based musician and producer Dazy (Nick Minutaglio, who has also recorded as Snocker). It was released on December 3, 2021, through Thirty Knots and Columbia Records. By November 2022, the song had reached the Billboard Hot 100 top 10, and had been streamed 397 million times on Spotify. In September 2022, the song topped the Canadian Hot 100. It was the most popular song of 2022 on TikTok in the UK.

Background
"Sunroof" is a collaboration between Dazy and Youre, and was born from a voice memo that Dazy received from Youre. Elaborating on the creation of their song, Youre has said, "I wanted to make a song that captured the feeling of excitement you get when you meet someone that you can't stop thinking about. I wanted to have a product that was fun and high-energy while still being easy to listen to. When I meet someone like this, the thought of them is like an itch in my brain that I can't scratch. So I wanted the song to be catchy so it sticks in your head just like when you're stuck thinking about someone".

Critical reception
Benjamin Kronenberg at Early Rising praised the song and described it as a track that sticks "in your head all day" thanks to the "bright production" by Dazy and Youre's "bubbling and poppy vocals". Miles Opton of Sheesh Media called the song an "immediate ear-worm pop track" that features "crisp production" by Dazy and "high-energy vocal melodies".

The song was also called a contender for song of the summer 2022.

Track listing

Charts

Weekly charts

Year-end charts

Certifications

References

2021 songs
2021 singles
Canadian Hot 100 number-one singles
Columbia Records singles
American pop rock songs
Bedroom pop songs
Alternative pop songs